Wicksteed Ward is a two-member ward within Kettering Borough Council. Traditionally regarded as a Labour safe seat, owing to the presence of the Highfield Road Council Estate, the ward became a marginal seat between Labour and the Conservatives in the 2003 Borough Council elections before, after resignation of the sole Conservative councillor in the autumn of 2005, the seat was recaptured by the Labour Party in a by-election.

The most recent councillors prior to the Ward's abolition were Cllr. Alex Gordon and Cllr. Lynsey Tod, both members of the Labour Party.

Councillors
Wicksteed Ward By-Election: 6 October 2005
Cllr. Lynsey Tod (Labour)
Replacing Cllr. Derek Darby (Conservative)

Kettering Borough Council Elections 2003
Cllr. Derek Darby (Conservative)
Cllr. Alex Gordon (Labour)

Kettering Borough Council Elections 1999
Cllr. Alex Gordon (Labour)
Cllr. Roy Mayhew (Labour)

Election results

Wicksteed Ward By-Election: 6 October 2005
Cause: Resignation of Cllr. Derek Darby
Holding Party: Conservative

Electorate: 2638

Kettering Borough Council Elections 2003

(Vote count shown is ward average)

See also
Kettering
Kettering Borough Council

Electoral wards in Kettering